Dvorana Velesajam is an ice arena located in Zagreb, Croatia. The capacity of the arena is 500 and it is located at Ulica Jozefa Antala BB, in Novi Zagreb.

Throughout the weekdays the arena is mainly used by those training ice hockey and skating. On some weekends the arena is also available to the public for recreational skating.

See also
Dom Sportova

References

External links
 Klizalište Velesajam - official web site 

Indoor arenas in Croatia
Indoor ice hockey venues in Croatia
Sports venues in Zagreb
Novi Zagreb